Margaret Clark Formby (July 12, 1929 – April 10, 2003) was an American educator best known as the founder of the National Cowgirl Museum and Hall of Fame.

References

Journalists from Texas
Texas Republicans
Accidental deaths from falls
American curators
American women curators
Non-traditional rodeo performers
Cowgirl Hall of Fame inductees
Ranchers from Texas
Museum founders
20th-century American educators
Schoolteachers from Texas
20th-century American women educators
20th-century philanthropists
1929 births
2003 deaths
People from Hereford, Texas
People from Culberson County, Texas
Texas Tech University alumni
20th-century American journalists
21st-century American women